Lt-Col Charles Waley Cohen CMG (1879 – 16 January 1963), was a British soldier, barrister and Liberal Party politician.

Background
Cohen was born the third son of Nathaniel Louis Cohen, a stock broker, and Julia Matilda Waley. Robert Waley Cohen (1877–1952) was his brother and Dorothea Waley Singer (1882–1964) was his sister. He was educated at Clifton College  and Balliol College, Oxford. He married in 1909. He was made a Commander of the Order of the British Empire in the 1919 Birthday Honours.

Professional career
Cohen was a Barrister who was Called to Bar in 1903. He served in the Army from 1915 to 1921. He was Mentioned in dispatches, awarded the CMG and the Légion d’honneur.

Political career
Cohen was Liberal candidate for the Yeovil division of Somerset at the 1923 Yeovil by-election and at the 1923 General Election shortly after. He was Liberal candidate for the Portsmouth Central division of Hampshire at the 1929 General Election. He did not stand for parliament again.

Electoral record

References

1879 births
1963 deaths
Liberal Party (UK) parliamentary candidates
People educated at Clifton College
Alumni of Balliol College, Oxford
British Army personnel of World War I
Waley-Cohen family